The 2015 European Athletics U23 Championships were the 10th edition of the biennial athletics competition between European athletes under the age of twenty-three. It was held in Tallinn, Estonia from 8 to 12 July.

Medal summary

Men

Women

Medal table

Participation
According to an unofficial count, 934 athletes from 45 countries participated in the event.

References

External links
European Athletics Association

 
2013
International athletics competitions hosted by Estonia
European Athletics U23 Championships
Athletics U23
European Athletics U23 Championships
Sports competitions in Tallinn
2015 in youth sport